Elo Edema Edeferioka (born 10 April 1993) is a Nigerian basketball player for Celta de Vigo Baloncesto and the Nigerian national team.

She participated at the 2018 FIBA Women's Basketball World Cup.

Hofstra statistics

Source

References

External links

1993 births
Living people
Centers (basketball)
Georgia Tech Yellow Jackets women's basketball players
Life Center Academy alumni
Nigerian expatriate basketball people in the United States
Nigerian expatriate basketball people in Spain
Nigerian women's basketball players
Sportspeople from Warri